The Royalty: La Realeza (Nuestra Segunda Obra Maestra) is the second studio album following the success of Masterpiece by R.K.M & Ken-Y. After a -year wait, their album was released on September 9, 2008. The first official single off the album is "Mis Dias Sin Ti" and the song was released on December 18, 2007.  The second official single off the album is "Te Regalo Amores" and the song was released on August 26, 2008. The album moved 15,000 copies within the United States during its first week. It received a nomination for Best Latin Urban Album at the Grammy Awards of 2009.

Track listing

iTunes Bonus Track

Special Edition DVD 

R.K.M & Ken-Y were awarded a Platinum Album for "The Royalty: La Realeza" at a conference in Miami, Florida. Their album sold more than 200,000 since its release on September 9.

Charts

Sales and certifications

References

2008 albums
R.K.M & Ken-Y albums
Machete Music albums
Pina Records albums